Tunisia competed at the 1988 Summer Olympics in Seoul, South Korea.

Competitors
The following is the list of number of competitors in the Games.

Athletics

Men
Track & road events

Football

Men

First round

Group A

Swimming

Women

Table tennis

Volleyball

Men's team competition

Pool B

|}

|}

9th–12th semifinals

|}

11th place match

|}

Team Roster

Faycal Ben Amara
Mohamed Sarsar
Rachid Bousarsar
Lotfi Ben Slimane 
Msaddak Lahmar
Hedi Bousarsar
Abderrazak Ben Messaoud 
Raouf Chenoufi
Hichem Ben Amira
Mourad Tebourski
Abdelaziz Ben Abdallah 
Fethi Ghariani
Head coach: Hubert Wagner

Wrestling

Men's Greco-Roman

Men's Freestyle

References

Official Olympic Reports

Nations at the 1988 Summer Olympics
1988
1988 in Tunisian sport